The Argentine general election of 1946, the last for which only men were enfranchised, was held on 24 February. Voters chose both the President and their legislators.

Background
Conservative rule, maintained through electoral fraud despite a moderate record, was brought to an end in a June 1943 coup d'état. Barking "orders of the day" every morning on the radio, the new regime enjoyed little approval. The devastating 1944 San Juan earthquake presented an opportunity to regain lost goodwill and the regime moved quickly, involving the private sector through nationwide fund-raising, entrusted to the Labor Minister, Juan Perón.  Perón enlisted celebrities for the effort, among which was a radio matinee star of middling talent, Eva Duarte, who introduced herself to the Labor Minister by remarking that "nothing's missing, except a touch of Atkinson's".  The effort's success and the rise of his ally, Edelmiro Farrell, within the junta, led to Perón's appointment as vice-president, which he leveraged in support of Argentina's struggling labor unions, particularly the CGT.

Perón's sudden clout led to growing rivalry among his junta colleagues, who had him arrested on October 9, a surprise move outdone by CGT leaders like retail workers' leader Ángel Borlenghi, the slaughterhouses' Cipriano Reyes and Eva Duarte, herself.  Organizing a mass (and, at times, violent) demonstration for his release on the Plaza de Mayo, their October 17, 1945, mobilization marked a turning point in Argentine history: the creation of the Peronist movement.  Capitulating to the political winds, the junta bestowed presidential powers on Perón, who initiated his program of mass nationalizations of institutions such as the universities and Central Bank.  Calling elections for February 1946, Perón's opposition hastily arranged an alliance, the Democratic Union.  Many in the centrist Radical Civic Union were steadfastly opposed to this ad hoc union with conservatives and the left, an intrinsic burden compounded by a white paper scathingly critical of Perón released by the U.S. Ambassador, Spruille Braden. The report, accusing Perón of fascist ties, allowed him to marginalize the Democratic Union (and their distinguished, though disastrously-named nominees, José Tamborini and Enrique Mosca – the "tambourine and the fly"). He quickly reframed the argument as one between "Perón or Braden", making this his rallying cry and winning the 1946 elections handily.

Candidates for President 
Labor Party: Former Vice-president Juan Perón from Buenos Aires Province
Democratic Union (UCR-led alliance): Former Congressman José Tamborini from the city of Buenos Aires

Results

President

Chamber of Deputies

Results by province

Provincial Governors

References

Online references
Todo Argentina  

1946
1946 elections in South America
1946 in Argentina
1946
February 1946 events in South America